Damien Douglas Jr. (born January 30, 1996), better known by his stage name Selfish (often stylized as SELFISH.), is an American rapper, singer, songwriter and engineer from Denver, Colorado. He previously went by the stage name of Damien the Architect. In May 2017, he signed a distribution contract with Empire Distribution. On May 23, 2017, he released his debut album, For Your Girl Too.

Discography

Studio albums

Mixtapes

(previously under the name of Damien the Architect)

References 

Living people
1996 births